Jane McCrea (1752 – July 27, 1777) was an American woman who was killed by a Native American warrior serving alongside a British Army expedition under the command of John Burgoyne during the American Revolutionary War. Engaged to a Loyalist officer serving under Burgoyne, her death lead to widespread outrage in the Thirteen Colonies and was used by Patriots as part of their anti-British propaganda campaign.

Born in Bedminster, New Jersey, McCrea moved to Saratoga, New York where she became engaged to David Jones, a Loyalist. When the Revolutionary War broke out, Jones fled to Quebec while McCrea's brothers divided their loyalties between the British and the Patriots. During the Saratoga campaign of 1777, McCrea left her brother's home to join Jones who was stationed in Fort Ticonderoga. While staying at Fort Edward, McCrea was abducted, killed and scalped by a group of Native American warriors.

Upon receiving word of the incident, Burgoyne attempted to punish the culprit but was dissuaded from doing so. Her death was widely reported on throughout the Thirteen Colonies; historians and journalists frequently embellished the incident. The killing of McCrea also inspired American resistance to the British, contributing to the failure of the Saratoga campaign. McCrea's life and death eventually became part of American folklore, with pantomimes, poems, folk songs and novels being written about her. Her body has been exhumed numerous times since her death.

Life
Jane McCrea was born in Bedminster, New Jersey, one of the younger children in the large family of Rev. James McCrea. After her mother died and her father remarried, McCrea moved in with her brother John who lived near Saratoga, New York, where she eventually became engaged to David Jones. When the American Revolutionary War broke out, two of her brothers joined the Continental Army and three others became Loyalists, while her fiancé fled to Quebec, which was under British control. During the summer of 1777, as British Army officer John Burgoyne's expedition neared the Hudson River, John (who by now was serving as a colonel in the Albany County militia) took up service in the 13th Albany County Militia Regiment. Jones, on the other hand, was serving as a lieutenant in a Loyalist militia unit accompanying Burgoyne's expedition, and was stationed at Fort Ticonderoga after the British captured it from the Americans.

Around the same time, McCrea left her brother's home to join her fiancé at Fort Ticonderoga. She eventually reached Fort Edward on July 1777.  McCrea stayed at the home of Loyalist Sara McNeil, who was a cousin of British Army officer Simon Fraser. On the morning of July 27, a group of Native Americans led by a Wyandot warrior known as Le Loup or Wyandot Panther attacked Fort Edward. They killed a settler and his family, then ambushed and killed Lieutenant Tobias Van Vechten (who was serving under John McCrea) and four others. What happened next is the subject of dispute; what is known is that Jane McCrea and Sarah McNeil were abducted by the Native Americans and separated. McNeil was eventually taken to Burgoyne's camp, where either she or David Jones recognized McCrea's supposedly distinctive scalp being carried by an Native American warrior.

One account of McCrea's death was given by British explorer Thomas Anburey. Anburey claimed that two Native American warriors, one of them Le Loup, were escorting McCrea to Burgoyne's camp when they started to quarrel over an expected reward for bringing her there. One of the pair then killed and scalped her, and Le Loup ended up with the scalp. Anburey also claimed that she was taken against her will, though he noted that there were also rumors that she was being escorted at her fiancé's request. A second account of her death, given by Le Loup while he was questioned by the British, was that McCrea was killed by American forces stationed at Fort Edward firing at the attacking Native Americans while they were retreating. Historian James Phinney Baxter supported the second account in his work The British Invasion from the North (1887) where he asserted that an exhumation of her body revealed only bullet wounds and no tomahawk wounds. Salem, New York historians wrote in 1896, "Jane McCrea made her visit to Mrs. McNeill, of Fort Edward. While at the home of Mrs. McNeill the house was attacked by a band of Indians. Jane and Mrs. McNeill were violently seized and carried off, Jane being placed upon a horse Mrs. McNeill being dragged along on foot. The Indians were hotly pursued by a band of Americans from the fort, who occasionally discharged their rifles at the flying fugitives. Jane was shot through the body by one of these stray bullets, and, falling from her horse, she was scalped by one of her captors and left dead upon the ground." McCrea's death was also reported by American surgeon John Bartlett, who claimed McCrea and McNeil were taken by the Native Americans to Burgoyne's camp, where McCrea was shot and scalped.

Reaction to McCrea's death

When Burgoyne received news of McCrea's death, he went to the camp of Native American warriors accompanying his expedition and ordered that the culprit be delivered to him, threatening to have him executed. Simor Fraser and interpreter Luc de la Corne informed Burgoyne that such an act would result in the defection of all Native American warriors from his expedition and might lead them to take revenge as they travelled back north. Burgoyne relented, and no action was taken against the Native Americans with regards to this incident.

News of McCrea's death travelled relatively quickly around the Thirteen Colonies by the standards of the time. News accounts of her death were published in Pennsylvania on August 11 and as far away as Virginia on August 22. The accounts of her death become increasingly exaggerated as they travelled, claiming that indiscriminate massacres of Loyalists and Patriots were being perpetrated by Native Americans. Burgoyne's campaign had intended to use Native Americans as a means to intimidate the colonists; however, the American reaction to the news was not what he had hoped for. Patriot propaganda efforts received a boost after Burgoyne wrote a letter to Continental Army officer Horatio Gates, complaining about the American treatment of prisoners of war captured at  the Battle of Bennington on August 17. Gates' response was widely reprinted:

 That the savages of America should in their warfare mangle and scalp the unhappy prisoners who fall into their hands is neither new nor extraordinary; but that the famous Lieutenant General Burgoyne, in whom the fine gentleman is united with the soldier and the scholar, should hire the savages of America to scalp europeans and the descendants of europeans, nay  more, that he should pay a price for each scalp so barbarously taken, is more than will be believed in England. [...] Miss McCrae, a young lady lovely to the sight, of virtuous character and amiable disposition, engaged to be married to an officer of your army, was [...] carried into the woods, and there scalped and mangled in the most shocking manner [...] 

News accounts of her death elaborated on McCrea's supposed beauty, describing her as "lovely in disposition, so graceful in manners and so intelligent in features, that she was a favorite of all who knew her", and that her hair "was of extraordinary length and beauty, measuring a yard and a quarter".  One of the few contemporary accounts of the incident by someone who actually saw her personally was that of James Wilkinson, who described her as "a country girl of honest family in circumstances of mediocrity, without either beauty or accomplishments".  Later accounts frequently embellished details; historian Richard Ketchum notes that the color of her hair has been described as everything from black to blonde to red; he also cited an 1840s examination of an alleged lock of her hair that described it as "reddish".

Her death, and those of others in similar raids, inspired American resistance to Burgoyne's expedition, contributing to his defeat at the battles of Saratoga. The effect expanded as reports of the incident were used as propaganda to excite Patriot sympathies later in the war, especially before the 1779 Sullivan Expedition. David Jones, apparently bitter over the incident, never married and settled in British North America as a United Empire Loyalist. The story eventually became a part of American folklore. An anonymous poet wrote "The Ballad of Jane McCrea", which was set to music and became a popular folk song.  In Philadelphia in 1799, Ricketts' Circus performed "The Death of Miss McCrea", a pantomime co-written by John Durang; artist John Vanderlyn painted a depiction of her death in 1805. There are several markers in and near Fort Edward commemorating her death.

Exhumations
McCrea's remains have been moved three times. The first time was in 1822, and the second was in 1852, when they were moved to the Union Cemetery in Fort Edward. Her body was exhumed again in 2003 in hopes of solving the mystery of how she died. Unexpectedly, two bodies—those of McCrea and Sara McNeil—were found in the grave. The 1822 move had placed McCrea's remains atop the burial vault of McNeil (who died in 1799 of natural causes). Both skeletons were largely complete, though McCrea's skull was missing, possibly due to reported grave robberies in the 19th century. The bodies were exhumed again in 2005 for further analysis, and were subsequently reburied in separate graves.

References

Notes

Citations

Books

Journals and magazines

Further reading

1752 births
1777 deaths
American Revolutionary War deaths
People from Bedminster, New Jersey
People of New York (state) in the American Revolution
Women in the American Revolution
Deaths by firearm in New York (state)
18th-century American people
People of colonial New Jersey
Saratoga campaign